The first 1961 Major League Baseball All-Star Game was played in Candlestick Park in San Francisco on July 11, 1961.  The National League scored two runs in the bottom of the tenth inning to win 5–4.  Stu Miller was the winning pitcher and Hoyt Wilhelm was charged with the loss.

Rosters
Players in italics have since been inducted into the National Baseball Hall of Fame.

American League

National League

Game

Umpires: Stan Landes, Home Plate (NL); Frank Umont, First Base (AL); Shag Crawford, Second Base (NL);  Ed Runge, Third Base (AL); Ed Vargo, Left Field (NL); Cal Drummond, Right Field (AL)

Starting lineups

Game Summary

References

Further reading
 United Press International. "Clemente's Hit in 10th Scores Mays and Gives Nationals All-Star Victory; Teams Make Record 7 Errors in Swirling San Francisco Wind". The Louisville Courier-Post. July 12, 1961.

Major League Baseball All-Star Game
Major League Baseball All-Star Game
Baseball competitions in San Francisco
Major League Baseball All Star Game
July 1961 sports events in the United States
1961 in San Francisco